Thiago Silva de Paiva or simply Thiaguinho  (born June 14, 1985, in Rio de Janeiro), is a Brazilian midfielder who plays for Duque de Caxias.

Contract
Vasco (Loan) 1 January 2008 to 31 December 2008
Boavista-RJ 2 February 2007 to 31 December 2011

External links
 crvascodagama.com
 sambafoot
 globoesporte
 CBF
 Guardian Stats Centre
 netvasco.com.br

1985 births
Living people
Brazilian footballers
Boavista Sport Club players
CR Vasco da Gama players
Duque de Caxias Futebol Clube players
Clube de Regatas Brasil players
América Futebol Clube (MG) players
Association football midfielders
Footballers from Rio de Janeiro (city)